The Isaiah Wilson Snugs House, also known as the Isaiah Wilson Snugs House and the Marks House, are two historic homes located at Albemarle, Stanly County, North Carolina. The Marks House was built about 1847, and is a two-story, transitional Federal / Greek Revival style frame dwelling. It is the oldest surviving house in Albemarle. It was moved to its present site behind the Snuggs house in 1975. The Isaiah Wilson Snuggs House, the second oldest in Albemarle, was built about 1874, and is a two-story, three-bay, frame dwelling, with a two-room kitchen/dining room ell.  The houses were restored in the 1980s and are operated as historic house museums by the Stanly County Museum.

It was added to the National Register of Historic Places in 1995.

References

External links

Snuggs House museum
Freeman-Marks House museum

Historic house museums in North Carolina
Historic American Buildings Survey in North Carolina
Houses on the National Register of Historic Places in North Carolina
Greek Revival houses in North Carolina
Federal architecture in North Carolina
Houses completed in 1850
Houses in Stanly County, North Carolina
National Register of Historic Places in Stanly County, North Carolina